Libération is the first studio album released by Les Rythmes Digitales. It was released in limited fashion in 1996.

Track listing
"Scimitar"
"Oberonne"
"Carlos"
"American Metal"
"La Solution?"
"Vive Le Velo"
"Jida"
"Kontakte"
"Ormalite"

References 

1996 debut albums
Wall of Sound (record label) albums
Stuart Price albums